The 2021–22 Austin Peay Governors men's basketball team represented Austin Peay State University in the 2021–22 NCAA Division I men's basketball season. The Governors, led by first-year head coach Nate James, played their home games at the Winfield Dunn Center in Clarksville, Tennessee as members of the Ohio Valley Conference (OVC). They finished the season 12–17, 8–10 in OVC play to finish in a tie for fifth place. As the No. 6 seed in the OVC tournament, they lost to Tennessee Tech in the first round. 

The season marked the end of one era for Austin Peay, and was originally intended to be the end of a second. After the season, the Governors left the OVC, their home since 1962, to join the ASUN Conference. The season was intended to be the Governors' last at the Dunn Center, with the new F&M Bank Arena in downtown Clarksville originally set to open for the 2022–23 season. However, the opening of the new arena has now been delayed to July 2023.

Previous season
In  a season limited due to the ongoing COVID-19 pandemic, the Governors finished the 2020–21 season 14–13, 10–10 in OVC play to finish in a tie for fifth place. In the OVC tournament, they lost to Eastern Kentucky in the first round.

On March 28, 2021, it was announced that head coach Matt Figger had resigned in order to take the head coaching position at Texas–Rio Grande Valley. On April 2, the school announced that Duke assistant coach Nate James had been named the team's new head coach.

Roster

Schedule and results

|-
!colspan=12 style=| Exhibition

|-
!colspan=12 style=| Non-conference regular season

|-
!colspan=12 style=| Ohio Valley regular season

|-
!colspan=9 style=| Ohio Valley tournament

Source

References

Austin Peay Governors men's basketball seasons
Austin Peay Governors
Austin Peay Governors basketball
Austin Peay Governors basketball